Rafi Haladjian born in Beirut, Lebanon in 1961) is a French serial entrepreneur of Armenian origin. He is the co-creator of the wireless-connected rabbit Nabaztag, a smart object of the Internet of Things. He is currently CEO of Sen.se.

Career 

In the 2000s, he created the Nabaztag, a Wi-Fi connected, rabbit-shaped device that reads emails, news, and other digital information aloud. In 2014, as the CEO and founder of the company Sen.se, he launched Mother, a new connected device that works as a hub for home sensors.

References

External links
 https://web.archive.org/web/20071016225407/http://agbu.org/publications/article.asp?A_ID=194

Year of birth missing (living people)
Living people
Businesspeople from Beirut
French people of Armenian descent
Lebanese emigrants to France
Lebanese people of Armenian descent
Armenian inventors
French businesspeople